BioMetals is a bimonthly peer-reviewed scientific journal covering the role of metal ions in biological systems. It is published by Springer Science+Business Media and the editor-in-chief are Isabelle Michaud-Soret and Christopher Rensing. Associate editors are Hans Vogel, Hajo Haase and Shelley Payne. The journal was established in 1988 as Biology of Metals and obtained its current name in 1992. It is the official journal of the International Biometals Society. According to the Journal Citation Reports, the journal has a 2020 impact factor of 2.949.

References

External links 
 

Biochemistry journals
Springer Science+Business Media academic journals
Bimonthly journals
Publications established in 1988
English-language journals
Academic journals associated with learned and professional societies